Money Gap Ltd (trading as CashLady) is UK-based financial services company and a short-term loan broker operating in London, England. Founded in 2008, Money Gap works with various payday and short-term loan providers, matching applicants with lenders. MGG acts as an intermediary in this capacity.

Regulatory action 
In 2013 Cash Lady was heavily criticised over an advertising campaign featuring Kerry Katona. Following complaints to the Advertising Standards Authority (United Kingdom), CashLady advertisements were re-edited to remove the phrase 'Fast Cash for Fast Lives'. The ASA believed that this phrase implied that a payday loan would ‘help fund a high-flying celebrity lifestyle’. In July 2013, (one month later) Kerry Katona declared bankruptcy for the second time and was subsequently dropped by Cash Lady after the ASA ruled that Cash Lady could no longer use Katona in adverts due to heavy associations with personal debt.

In 2014 Money Gap Group Limited was one of the companies helping the Competition and Markets Authority in the payday lending market investigation.

References

External links 
 Company website

Privately held companies based in London
British companies established in 2008
2008 establishments in England
Payday loan companies
Online financial services companies of the United Kingdom